This article presents a list of the historical events and publications of Australian literature during 1866.

Books 

 Benjamin Farjeon – Grif : A Story of Colonial Life
 Mary Fortune
 Bertha's Legacy
 Cyzlia the Dwarf : A Romance
 The Secrets of Balbrooke : A Tale
 Maud Jeanne Franc – Minnie's Mission : An Australian Temperance Tale
 Eliza Winstanley  – Desmoro : or, The Red Hand

Short stories 

 Rolf Boldrewood – "A Kangaroo Drive"
 Marcus Clarke – "The Dual Existence"
 Mary Fortune – "Kirsty Oglevie"

Poetry 

 Ada Cambridge – Hymns on the Holy Communion
 Adam Lindsay Gordon
 "The Old Leaven"
 "Visions in the Smoke"
 Henry Kendall
 "Campaspe"
 "Sitting by the Fire" (aka "Song")
 "The Voyage of Telegonus"
 Menie Parkes
 Poems

Births 

A list, ordered by date of birth (and, if the date is either unspecified or repeated, ordered alphabetically by surname) of births in 1866 of Australian literary figures, authors of written works or literature-related individuals follows, including year of death.

 26 March – Barcroft Boake, poet (died 1892)
 11 April – Bernard O'Dowd, poet (died 1953)
 21 July – Charles Wiltens Andree Hayward, poet and short story writer (died 1950)

See also 
 1866 in Australia
 1866 in literature
 1866 in poetry
 List of years in Australian literature
 List of years in literature

References

 
Australia
19th-century Australian literature
Australian literature by year